The 2022–23 Michigan Wolverines men's basketball team represented the University of Michigan during the 2022–23 NCAA Division I men's basketball season. The season marked the program's 107th season and its 106th consecutive year as a member of the Big Ten Conference. The Wolverines were led by fourth-year head coach Juwan Howard, and played their home games for the 56th consecutive year at Crisler Center in Ann Arbor, Michigan.

Previous season
The Wolverines finished the 2021–22 season 19–15, 11–9 in Big Ten play to finish in a tie for seventh place. As the No. 8 seed in the Big Ten tournament, they lost to Indiana in the second round. The Wolverines received an at-large bid to the NCAA tournament as the No. 11 seed in the South region, where they defeated Colorado State, and Tennessee to advance to their fifth straight Sweet Sixteen. In the Sweet Sixteen, they lost to Villanova.

Offseason

Departures

Acquisitions

Incoming transfers

Recruiting classes
On Jun 17, 2021, Michigan received its first class of 2022 commitment from four-star point guard Dug McDaniel. On August 5, Michigan received its second commitment of the 2022 class, four-star center Tarris Reed. On October 5, Michigan received its third commitment of the 2022 class, four-star power forward Gregg Glenn III. On October 13, Michigan received its fourth commitment of the 2022 class, four-star small forward Jett Howard. At that time, Michigan's recruiting class was ranked the best in the Big Ten, and sixth in the country, according to 247Sports.

2022 recruiting class

2023 recruiting class

Roster

Regular season

November
Michigan began the season on November 7 with a 75–56 victory over Purdue Fort Wayne. Michigan was led by Hunter Dickinson with a game-high 22 points and 12 rebounds, for his 18th career double-double, while Jett Howard added 21 points. Dickinson reached 1,000 career points on a free throw with 3:43 remaining in the first half, becoming the 57th Wolverine to reach the milestone. On November 11, Michigan defeated Eastern Michigan 88–83. Michigan was led by Dickinson with a game-high 31 points, while Terrance Williams II added 18 points and a career-high 11 rebounds for his first career double-double. Dickinson tied a career-high with 13 field goals made on 17 attempts. On November 14, Dickinson and Howard were named the Big Ten Player of the Week and Big Ten Freshman of the Week, respectively. Dickinson averaged 26.5 points, 9.5 rebounds, and 1.5 blocked shots, while Howard averaged 15.0 points, 2.5 rebounds, 4.5 assists, 1.0 steals, and 1.5 blocked shots in Michigan's two victories last week. On November 16, Michigan defeated Pittsburgh 91–60 in the semifinals of the Legends Classic. Michigan was led by Howard with a game-high 17 points, whille Kobe Bufkin and Joey Baker added 14 points each, and Dickinson added 11 points and seven rebounds. With seven rebounds, Dickinson became the 46th Wolverine to reach the 500 rebounds milestone. After reaching 1,000 points in the season-opener against Purdue Fort Wayne, he became the 31st member of Michigan's 1000 point/500 rebound club. The next day Michigan lost to Arizona State 62–87 in the Legends Classic championship game. Michigan was led by Dickinson with 14 points, while Howard added 12 points. On November 20, Michigan defeated Ohio 70–66 in overtime. Michigan was led by Dickinson with a game-high 24 points and 14 rebounds for his 19th career double-double, while Howard added 14 points and a career-high four blocks, and Jaelin Llewellyn added 10 points. On November 23, Michigan defeated Jackson State 78–68. Michigan was led by Howard with a game-high 19 points, while Williams added 11 points, Bufkin added 10 points and a career-high three blocks, and Dickinson added nine points and 12 rebounds, one-point shy of a double-double. Michigan's defense blocked 13 shots, tied for the second-most in a single game in program history. On November 29, Michigan lost to (No. 3 AP Poll/No. 3 Coaches Poll) Virginia 68–70 in the ACC–Big Ten Challenge. Michigan was led by Dickinson with a game-high 23 points, while Howard added 15 points and Bufkin added 11 points. This was Howard's fifth consecutive game scoring in double figures.

December
On December 4, Michigan lost to (No. 19 AP Poll/No. 18 Coaches Poll) Kentucky 69–73 in the Basketball Hall of Fame London Showcase. Michigan was led by Dickinson with a game-high 23 points, nine rebounds, and three blocks, while Howard added 16 points and Bufkin added 11 points. During the game Llewellyn suffered a season-ending ACL injury in his left knee. On December 8, Michigan defeated Minnesota 90–75 in its Big Ten Conference season opener. Michigan was led by Dickinson with a game-high 19 points, while Bufkin and Dug McDaniel added a career-high 15 points each, and Howard added 14 points. McDaniel made his first career start, replacing the injured Llewellyn. On December 17, Michigan defeated Lipscomb 83–75. Michigan was led by Bufkin with a career-high 22 points, while Howard added 19 points, Dickinson added 15 points, Williams II added 11 points, and McDaniel added seven points and a career-high eight rebounds. On December 21, Michigan lost to North Carolina 76–80 in the Jumpman Invitational. Michigan was led by Bufkin with 22 points, while Howard added 17 points, and Williams II added eight points and a career-high-tying 11 rebounds. On December 30, Michigan lost to Central Michigan 61–63 in their final non-conference game. Michigan was led by Bufkin with 16 points, while Dickinson added 13 points, Howard added 12 points, his tenth consecutive game scoring in double-figures, and McDaniel added 10 points. Baker appeared in his 100th career game after checking in off the bench in the first half. He appeared in 88 games with Duke before transfering to Michigan this season.

January
On January 1, Michigan defeated Maryland 81–46. Michigan was led by Dickinson with a season-high 32 points and 12 rebounds for his 20th career double-double, while Williams II added 11 points. Michigan's defense held Maryland to just 13 first-half points, which tied the program record for fewest first-half points allowed. The Wolverines's opened the game on a 17–0 scoring run, including shooting 7-for-7 from the field. On January 4, Michigan defeated Penn State 79–69. Michigan was led by Dickinson with 17 points, while Bufkin and Howard added 14 points each, and McDaniel added 12 points. On January 7, Michigan lost their rivalry game against Michigan State 53–59. Michigan was led by Dickinson with a game-high 18 points, while Bufkin added 15 points and three steals, and Howard added 10 points. On January 12, Michigan lost to Iowa 84–93 in overtime. Michigan was led by Howard with a career-high 34 points, behind seven three-pointers, while McDaniel added 12 points, seven assists and six rebounds, and Dickinson added 12 points and 13 rebounds for his 21st career double-double. Howard matched his career high in points (21), field goals made (8) and three-pointers made (5) in the first half alone. Howard's 34 points were the most by a Wolverine since Daniel Horton scored 34 in 2006. On January 15, Michigan defeated Northwestern 85–78. Michigan was led by Bufkin with 20 points, while McDaniel added a career-high 17 points, Howard added 16 points, and Dickinson added 10 points and a career-high tying 15 rebounds for his 22nd career double-double. With his double-double Dickinson passed Cazzie Russell for 17th all-time in Michigan program history. On January 19, Michigan lost to Maryland 58–64. Michigan was led by Dickinson with 19 points, and ten rebounds for his 23rd career double-double, while Howard added 13 points, and Williams II added nine points and a career-high 13 rebounds, one-point shy of a double-double. On January 22, Michigan defeated Minnesota 60–56. Michigan was led by Dickinson with a game-high 23 points, and nine rebounds, while Bufkin added 12 points, and McDaniel added ten points and a career-high tying eight rebounds. Jett Howard exited the game in the first half with a left ankle injury and did not return. On January 26, Michigan lost to (No. 1 AP Poll/No. 1 Coaches Poll) Purdue 70–75. Michigan was led by Dickinson with a game-high 21 points and seven rebounds, while Bufkin added 16 points and Baker added 11 points in his first start as a Wolverine, replacing the injured Howard. On January 29, Michigan lost to Penn State 61–83. Michigan was led by Jett Howard with 21 points, behind five three-pointers, while Bufkin added eight points and six rebounds and Jace Howard added a career-high six points.

February
On February 2, Michigan defeated Northwestern 68–51. Michigan was led by Dickinson with 19 points, while Bufkin added 15 points, a career-high 12 rebounds and eight assists, for his first career double-double, Baker added a season high 14 points, and McDaniel added a career-high nine assists. On February 5, Michigan won their rivalry game against Ohio State 77–69. Michigan was led by Dickinson with a game-high 26 points and 11 rebounds, for his 24th career double-double, while Howard added 16 points and Bufkin added 13 points, eight rebounds and five assists. With his double-double Dickinson tied Glen Rice for 12th most all-time in Michigan program history. On February 8, Michigan defeated Nebraska 93–72. Michigan was led by Howard with 22 points, while Dickinson added 16 points and 10 rebounds, for his 25th career double-double, McDaniel added 14 points and four assists, Bufkin added 13 points, seven rebounds and five assists, Baker added 11 points, and Williams II added 10 points and five rebounds. This marked the first time six Wolverines scored in double figures since December 6, 2019. With his double-double, Dickinson tied C. J. Kupec for 11th most all-time in Michigan program history. On February 11, Michigan lost to (No. 18 AP Poll/No. 18 Coaches Poll) Indiana 61–62. Michigan was led by Dickinson with 16 points, seven rebounds and three blocks, while Bufkin added 14 points, Howard added 12 points, and Tarris Reed Jr. added a career-high eight points and five rebounds. With three blocks, Dickinson became the third Wolverine to record 40 blocks in three consecutive seasons. Michigan was held scoreless during the final five minutes of the game, while neither team scored in the final three minutes of the game. On February 14, Michigan lost to Wisconsin 59–64. Michigan was led by Bufkin with 21 points, while Dickinson added 12 points and 12 rebounds, for his 26th career double-double. With his double-double, Dickinson tied Campy Russell for 10th most all-time in Michigan program history. Will Tschetter started his first career game, playing 26 minutes while recording four points and five rebounds. He replaced Williams II, who missed the game with a knee injury. On February 18, Michigan won their rivalry game against Michigan State 84–72, in Michigan State's first game since the Michigan State University shooting. Michigan was led by McDaniel with a career-high 18 points, while Bufkin added 17 points, Dickinson added 10 points and seven rebounds, Howard added 10 points, Baker added 10 points and Reed added eight points and a career-high 10 rebounds. Michigan ended the game on a 12–0 run, holding Michigan State scoreless for the final 2:29 of the game. On February 23, Michigan defeated Rutgers 58–45. Michigan was led by McDaniel with a game-high 16 points, and career-high five steals, while Bufkin added 14 points, and Dickinson added 13 points and 11 rebounds, for his 27th career double-double. McDaniel's five steals were the most for a Wolverine since Zavier Simpson also had five steals in a game against Villanova on November 14, 2018. On February 26, Michigan defeated Wisconsin 87–79 in overtime. Michigan was led by Bufkin with a career-high 28 points, while Dickinson added 23 points and 10 rebounds, for his 28th career double-double, and McDaniel added a career-high 20 points. With 1.8 seconds remaining in the game, Dickinson scored a buzzer-beating three-point shot to force overtime. Michigan outscored Wisconsin 19–11 in overtime.

March
On March 2, Michigan lost to Illinois 87–91 in double-overtime. Michigan was led by Dickinson with a game-high 31 points, and a career-high 16 rebounds, for his 29th double-double, while Bufkin added 23 points, and Howard added 15 points. This marked Michigan's first double-overtime game since 2020. With a three-pointer in the first quarter, Dickinson became the 22nd Wolverine to reach the 1,500 point milestone. With his 31 points, Dickinson surpassed current head coach Juwan Howard (1,526) for 20th on Michigan's all-time scoring list. On March 5, Michigan lost to (No. 15 AP Poll/No. 13 Coaches Poll) Indiana 73–75 in overtime. Michigan was led by Dickinson with 24 points, 14 rebounds, and a career-high tying five blocks, for his 30th career double-double, while Bufkin added 19 points, Howard added 16 points and McDaniel added 10 points. With 14 rebounds, Dickinson became the ninth Wolverine to surpass the 750-rebound mark, and the sixth Wolverine to reach 1,500 points and 750 rebounds.

Postseason

Big Ten tournament
On March 9, Michigan opened its 2023 Big Ten men's basketball tournament play with a 50–62 loss to Rutgers in the second round. Michigan was led by Dickinson with a game-high 24 points, seven rebounds and three blocks, while Bufkin added nine points, seven rebounds and five assists. Michigan struggled in the second half, scoring only one field goal until the final minute of the game.

NIT tournament
On March 12, Michigan received and accepted an at-large bid to the 2023 National Invitation Tournament as the No. 3 seed. This was the Wolverines' first National Invitation Tournament appearance since 2007. On March 14, Michigan began their participation in the 2023 NIT with a 90–80 victory over Toledo in the first round. Michigan was led by Bufkin with a game-high 23 points, eight rebounds and five assists, while Baker added a season-high 21 points, Dickinson added 19 points and nine rebounds, one rebound shy of a double-double, and McDaniel added 16 points and eight assists. Michigan shot a season-high 57 percent (13-for-23) from three-point range.

On March 18, Michigan lost to Vanderbilt in the second round. Michigan was led by Dickinson with 21 points and 11 rebounds, for his 31st career double-double, while McDaneil added 19 points, five rebounds, and three assists, and Baker added 11 points. Michigan opened the game with a 5–0 lead, before Vanderbilt answered with a 17–0 run to force a Michigan timeout with 12:51. Michigan responded with a 15–3 run to tie the game at 20. During the final five minutes of the half the teams shot a combined 33 percent (five-for-15) from the field, and Michigan led the game 30–29 at half-time. Vanderbilt took advantage of three Michigan turnovers in the final minute of the game to go on a 9–0 run and take a one-point lead with 12 seconds remaining in the game. Michigan missed layup attempts by McDaniel and Dickinson in the final seconds, and Vanderbilt won the game. Youssef Khayat started in his first career game, replacing an injured Bufkin, and scored three points and three rebounds in 17 minutes. With his double-double Dickinson tied Loy Vaught for sixth most all-time in Michigan program history. McDaniel became the sixth Michigan freshman to record at least 250 points, 100 rebounds and 100 assists in their freshman season, and the first since Derrick Walton Jr. in 2013–14.

Schedule and results

|-
!colspan=12 style=| Exhibition

|-
!colspan=12 style=|Regular season

                        
  

|-
!colspan=12 style=|  Big Ten tournament

|-
!colspan=9 style="background:#;"|NIT tournament

Rankings

*AP does not release post-NCAA Tournament rankings.

Honors
Following the season Hunter Dickinson was a first team All-Big Ten honoree by the media and second team honoree by the coaches. Both Jett Howard and Kobe Bufkin were third team honorees by the coaches and honorable mention honorees by the media. Howard was also an All-Freshman honoree by the Big Ten coaches.

References

Michigan Wolverines men's basketball seasons
Michigan
Michigan
Michigan
Michigan